Dmitri Ivanovich (11 October 155226 June 1553) was the eldest son of Ivan the Terrible, Tsar of Russia and as such the first Tsarevich (heir apparent). He died in infancy.

Birth
Dmitri was born as the third child and first son of Tsar Ivan the Terrible and his first Tsaritsa, Anastasia Romanovna. Dmitri became Grand Prince of Moscow at the age of three, in 1533. At his coronation, on 16 January 1547, the sixteen-year-old Ivan resurrected the title of Tsar, occasionally used by his grandfather and namesake, Ivan III of Moscow. Holding all of the power in his empire, he could choose his bride. He eventually picked Anastasia Romanovna, the daughter of a wealthy boyar. Throughout the first four years of their marriage, Anastasia presented Ivan with two daughters, Anna and Maria. Both died in infancy, Anna at the age of eleven months and Maria before her sixth month. However, on 11 October 1552, Anastasia gave birth to a son, whom they named Dmitri, presumably after ancestor Dmitri Donskoy. During a severe illness, Ivan asked the boyars to take an oath, making his infant son his heir apparent and the first Tsesarevich. However, the boyars were not very happy about this, as they wanted to see Ivan's cousin, Vladimir of Staritsa, succeed but they reluctantly accepted. Historians cannot agree whether this episode occurred in 1552 or 1553.

Death
In the summer of 1553, Ivan proposed a pilgrimage to Kirillo-Belozersky Monastery, near the present-day village of Kirillov. While on the Sora River, the royal boat was hit by a wave, it overturned and the Tsesarevich was dropped by his wet nurse. The adults managed to escape, but by the time they got to the baby, Dmitri had drowned. "The Chronicle" records that Maximus the Greek, who had recently visited Ivan, allegedly foresaw the death of the Tsesarevich. According to Andrey Kurbsky, Maximus had told Ivan that "he should not go such a long way with his wife and newborn lad".

Aftermath
Dmitri was interred in the Archangel Cathedral. After his death, Anastasia Romanovna would have three more children, two of whom would survive infancy. Ivan's youngest son by his last wife was named Dmitry after his eldest son who had died more than thirty years before.

References

|-

1552 births
1553 deaths
Heirs apparent who never acceded
Rurik dynasty
Royalty from Moscow
Russian tsareviches
Deaths by drowning
16th-century Russian people
Royalty and nobility who died as children